Just for Now is a 1967 studio album by Nancy Wilson, featuring arrangements by Billy May, Oliver Nelson, and Sid Feller. The album entered the Billboard 200 on June 3, 1967, and remained on the chart for 15 weeks, peaking at No. 40. It reached #8 on the Hot R&B LPs chart.

Track listing

Side 1 

 "Born Free" (Don Black, John Barry) – 2:04
 "That's Life" (Dean Kay, Kelly Gordon) – 2:35
 "What Now, My Love" (Pierre Delanoë, Carl Sigman, Gilbert Bécaud) – 2:25
 "Rain Sometimes" (Arthur Hamilton) – 2:16
 "Alfie" (Burt Bacharach, Hal David) – 3:01
 "Mercy, Mercy, Mercy" (Joe Zawinul, Gail Levy, Vincent Levy)  – 3:26

Side 2 

 "Winchester Cathedral" (Geoff Stephens) – 2:33
 "If He Walked Into My Life" (Jerry Herman) – 3:49
 "Love Can Do Anything" (Gene Di Novi, Mary Ann Maurer) – 2:34
 "Just for Now" (Dick Winograde) – 2:16
 "I'll Make A Man Of The Man" (Jimmy Van Heusen, Sammy Cahn) – 2:44

Personnel 
 Nancy Wilson - vocals
 Plas Johnson - tenor saxophone
 Pete Candoli - trumpet
 Donn Trenner – piano
 Mike Melvoin - organ
 John Collins - guitar
 Buster Williams - bass
 Earl Palmer - drums, latin percussion, bells
 Billy May - arranger, conductor (A1-3, A5-6, B1-2, B4)
 Oliver Nelson - arranger, conductor (A4, B3)
 Sid Feller - arranger, conductor (B5)
 David Cavanaugh - producer

References 

1967 albums
Nancy Wilson (jazz singer) albums
Capitol Records albums
Albums arranged by Billy May
Albums arranged by Oliver Nelson
Albums arranged by Sid Feller
Albums conducted by Sid Feller
Albums conducted by Billy May
Albums conducted by Oliver Nelson
Albums produced by Dave Cavanaugh